Mukhia or Mukhiya may refer to:

 Mukhi, a title for the head of community in parts of India
 Sunuwar people (exonym: Mukhia), an ethnic group of Nepal
 Sunuwar language, a Sino-Tibetan language of Nepal

People and fictional characters
 Harbans Mukhia (born 1939), Indian historian
 Brahmeshwar Singh (1947–2012), criminal and head of militia from Bihar, India
 Jitendra Mukhiya (born 1992), Nepalese cricketer
 Mukhiya, a recurring character in the Bahadur comics

See also 
 Mukhya Upanishads
 Mukia (disambiguation)
 Mukhyamantri (disambiguation)

Language and nationality disambiguation pages